In Japanese, Hōgen may refer to several words. Among them:
 Hōgen (era) (保元, 1156–1159), an era in Japan
 Hōgen rebellion, a short civil war in 1156
 dialect (方言) — for example: "eigo no hōgen" (English dialect)

See also
 Hogen - the Cornish word for pasty
 Japanese dialects